Ryan Cocker (born 3 July 1992) is a New Zealand rugby union footballer who currently plays as a tighthead prop for  in the ITM Cup.   From the 2016 Super Rugby season he will also represent the Melbourne Rebels in Super Rugby after signing a 1-year deal with the franchise.

References

1992 births
Living people
New Zealand rugby union players
Rugby union props
Taranaki rugby union players
Rugby union players from New Plymouth
New Zealand people of Australian descent
New Zealand expatriate rugby union players
Expatriate rugby union players in New Zealand
Melbourne Rebels players